Jacqueline Horn (born 1988) is a German slalom canoeist who competed at the international level from 2006 to 2011.

She won a bronze medal in the K1 team event at the 2009 ICF Canoe Slalom World Championships in La Seu d'Urgell.

Her younger sister Stefanie represents Italy in canoe slalom.

References

12 September 2009 results of the women's K1 team finals at the 2009 ICF Canoe Slalom World Championships. - accessed 12 September 2009.

German female canoeists
Living people
1988 births
Medalists at the ICF Canoe Slalom World Championships